Vineet Jain (born 1966) is an Indian entrepreneur and current Managing Director of Bennett, Coleman & Co. Limited, India’s oldest and largest media group in India, also known as Times Group. The Times Group is present across the media spectrum with a presence in Print, TV, Internet, Radio, Events and OOH. The Times Group has legacy of 180+ years and publishes leading Indian general and business newspaper – The Times of India and The Economic Times.

Career

Vineet Jain was born in Kolkata. He graduated from  the American College of Switzerland and joined the Times Group in 1987 . 

Vineet Jain handles the day to day operations of Times Group's entertainment and TV businesses.

Family and personal life
Jain is the great-grandson of Ramkrishna Dalmia, the first Indian owner of B.C.C.L. His grandfather, Shanti Prasad Jain, took over the company from Ramkrishna Dalmia. Shanti Prasad's son, Ashok Jain, took control of the company in the 1960s and was chairman of B.C.C.L. until his death in 1998 from heart failure.

Jain's mother, Indu Jain, used to hold the title of chairman of B.C.C.L. His sister Nandita Judge, who also worked at the company, died in a helicopter crash in 2001.

Jain is divorced. He splits his time between homes he shares with his brother in New Delhi and Mumbai.

Awards
 In 2009, Jain received the Rajiv Gandhi Award.
 He was conferred Impact Person of the Year Award in 2013.
 In the same year (2013), Vineet received the Entrepreneur of the Year Award from The Bombay Management Association. 
 He also won Media Person of the Year award from International Advertising Association in 2015 
 In 2018, he received Art Karat Award. 
 He won the ITA Sterling Icon of Indian Entertainment Award in Media category.(2009)  
 AsiaOne Magazine Global Indian of the Year 2018-19;
 Exchange4media News Broadcasting Lifetime Achievement Award (2018)
 Bharatiya Mahanatam Vikas Puraskar (2019)
·

References
16. https://et-gbs.com/speaker/vineet-jain/

Living people
Businesspeople from Delhi
Indian newspaper publishers (people)
Indian mass media owners
Indian billionaires
The Times Group people
20th-century Indian businesspeople
Year of birth missing (living people)
Jain families